PHMG is a provider of branding services, specializing in audio.

History 
Founded in 1998 as PleaseHoldUK in Chester, England, PHMG experienced rapid growth in its early years, reaching 250 clients and relocating to Manchester in 2000.

In 2008, the company rebranded to become PH Media Group. The rebrand from PH Media Group to PHMG followed in September 2016 and was also accompanied by a change to the company's logo.

A further rebrand was launched in 2022.

Products and services 
PHMG offers a range of audio branding services.
Core products include music on hold and on-hold marketing. Additional services include scriptwriting, audio production, sonic identity development, podcast production and sound production for TV and radio commercials.
It claims to have more than 32,000 clients worldwide, including Coca-Cola, Adidas and Audi.

Intellectual property 
PHMG claims to have a number of patents that protect it from being copied by competitors.

The first, issued in 2020, relates to a unique database of audio loops. Using data accumulated over many years, PHMG mapped adjectives (used by clients to describe themselves) against musical approaches that best embodied these qualities, and in turn with loops in their library. The completed library gives sounds ‘attributes’ that can be used to translate adjectives into musical identities.

PHMG acquired a second patent in 2021 in relation to processes undertaken by its post-production team.

Operations

Offices 
PHMG operates five staffed offices in the United Kingdom, United States and Australia, and has a number of additional business addresses in territories where it serves clients.

Staff 
PHMG employs over 500 staff. Notable alumni include:
Jacquire King, Executive Director of Production (since 2021)
Dane Liska, Head of Creative
Louis Gibzen, composer

Awards and accreditations 
In 2014, the company was named by Investec in their Mid-Market 100 list - as Please Hold (UK) - ranking it as one of the 100 fastest-growing private companies in the UK and recognizing it as the world's largest audio branding agency. Continued growth saw the company move up the Investec Mid-Market 100 list in 2015, from 48th position to 35th.

PHMG was also named on the 2015, 2016, 2017 and 2018 lists of ‘1000 Companies to Inspire Britain’ by London Stock Exchange, which aims to recognise some of the fastest-growing and most dynamic businesses in the UK. The company was also included in the ‘FT 1000: Europe’s Fastest Growing Companies’ list in 2018, as well as being named on the 2017, 2018 and 2019 ‘Greater Manchester Ward Hadaway Fastest 50’ lists.

In 2018, PHMG was named as one of 'Chicago's Best and Brightest Companies to Work For’ and was ranked tenth in the 'Leadership and Culture at Work: The CMI/Glassdoor Top 20' list. In 2019, the organization was awarded a ‘Great Place to Work’ certification, as well as being named as part of the European Business Awards 'Ones to Watch' list.

In February 2020 PHMG was named in the Sunday Times 100 Best Companies to Work For, ranking 49th in the list. PHMG was also named one of Chicago's best places to work in 2022.

Marketing

Market research 

PHMG has commissioned several studies to gauge perceptions among both consumers and businesses of music on hold and on-hold marketing.

Findings include that American consumers are more patient than British consumers; and that men are more patient than women.

Other findings include a 27% rise in the use of regional accents and dialect by UK businesses between January 2012 and January 2013. Research revealed the Scottish accent is perceived as trustworthy and reassuring while the Yorkshire accent, used by brands such as O2 in television and radio advertising, is seen as wise and honest.

Findings published in 2018 of a study conducted among 1,000 UK consumers revealed music can be more effective than visuals in shaping perceptions of a company's brand, with 60% of respondents deeming music more memorable when used in marketing. The same research in the US, conducted among 1,000 consumers, found 67% believe music is more memorable when used in marketing while in Australia, 66% of 1,000 respondents considered it more memorable.

Controversies 
In November 2021, the ACCC conducted an investigation into whether PHMG's contracts contained unfair terms. After an in-depth investigation, ACCC Deputy Chair Mick Keogh concluded that the terms were unfair, stating:

“The ACCC considered these contract terms were unfair, as the combination of PHMG’s termination clause and the automatic roll-over of the contract had the potential to cause significant financial detriment by requiring customers to, in effect, pay for a service they may no longer have needed, under a contract they thought had expired or had tried to cancel,”

PHMG co-operated with the investigation and agreed to amend its contract terms to address the concerns raised by ACCC. It also agreed to notify all customers whose contracts included one or more of the clauses of concern of the amendments.

Charitable work 
Aside from its business operations, PHMG also runs the PHMG Foundation, which aims to raise money for selected causes in the main territories where the company operates - the United Kingdom, the United States and Canada.
The foundation was launched in 2013, supporting causes such as the British Heart Foundation and the NSPCC, and during its first six years raised more than £500,000 for almost 50 charitable organisations.

References 

Companies based in Manchester
Audio branding